Project Cybersyn was a Chilean project from 1971 to 1973 during the presidency of Salvador Allende aimed at constructing a distributed decision support system to aid in the management of the national economy. The project consisted of four modules: an economic simulator, custom software to check factory performance, an operations room, and a national network of telex machines that were linked to one mainframe computer.

Project Cybersyn was based on viable system model theory approach to organizational design, and featured innovative technology at its time: it included a network of telex machines (Cybernet) in state-run enterprises that would transmit and receive information with the government in Santiago. Information from the field would be fed into statistical modeling software (Cyberstride) that would monitor production indicators, such as raw material supplies or high rates of worker absenteeism, in "almost" real time, alerting the workers in the first case and, in abnormal situations, if those parameters fell outside acceptable ranges by a very large degree, also the central government. The information would also be input into economic simulation software (CHECO, for CHilean ECOnomic simulator) that the government could use to forecast the possible outcome of economic decisions. Finally, a sophisticated operations room (Opsroom) would provide a space where managers could see relevant economic data, formulate feasible responses to emergencies, and transmit advice and directives to enterprises and factories in alarm situations by using the telex network.

The principal architect of the system was British operations research scientist Stafford Beer, and the system embodied his notions of organisational cybernetics in industrial management. One of its main objectives was to devolve decision-making power within industrial enterprises to their workforce in order to develop self-regulation of factories.

After the military coup on September 11, 1973, Cybersyn was abandoned, and the operations room was destroyed.

Name

The project's name in English (Cybersyn) is a portmanteau of the words cybernetics and synergy. Since the name is not euphonic in Spanish, in that language the project was called , both an initialism for the Spanish , ('system of information and control'), and a pun on the Spanish , the number five, alluding to the five levels of Beer's viable system model.

History
Stafford Beer was a British consultant in management cybernetics. He also sympathized with the stated ideals of Chilean socialism of maintaining Chile's democratic system and the autonomy of workers instead of imposing a Soviet-style system of top-down command and control.

In July 1971, Fernando Flores, a high-level employee of the Chilean Production Development Corporation (CORFO) under the instruction of Pedro Vuskovic, contacted Beer for advice on incorporating Beer's theories into the management of the newly nationalized sector of Chile's economy. Beer saw this as a unique opportunity to implement his ideas on a national scale. More than offering advice, he left most of his other consulting business and devoted much time to what became Project Cybersyn. He traveled to Chile often to collaborate with local implementors and used his personal contacts to secure help from British technical experts.

The implementation schedule was very aggressive, and the system had reached an advanced prototype stage at the start of 1973.

The system was most useful in October 1972, when about 40,000 striking truck drivers blocked the access streets that converged towards Santiago as part of a CIA-backed movement led by middle-class trucking bosses. According to Gustavo Silva (executive secretary of energy in CORFO), the system's telex machines helped organize the transport of resources into the city with only about 200 trucks driven by strike-breakers, lessening the potential damage caused by the 40,000 striking truck drivers.

System
There were 500 unused telex machines bought by the previous government. Each was put into a factory. In the control centre in Santiago, each day data coming from each factory (several numbers, such as raw material input, production output and number of absentees) were put into a computer, which made short-term predictions and necessary adjustments. There were four levels of control (firm, branch, sector, total), with algedonic feedback. If one level of control did not remedy a problem in a certain interval, the higher level was notified. The results were discussed in the operations room and a top-level plan was made. The network of telex machines, called Cybernet, was the first operational component of Cybersyn, and the only one regularly used by the Allende government.

The software for Cybersyn was called Cyberstride, and used Bayesian filtering and Bayesian control. It was written by Chilean engineers in consultation with a team of 12 British programmers. Cybersyn first ran on an IBM 360/50, but later was transferred to a less heavily used Burroughs 3500 mainframe.

The futuristic operations room was designed by a team led by the interface designer Gui Bonsiepe. It was furnished with seven swivel chairs (considered the best for creativity) with buttons, which were designed to control several large screens that could project the data, and other panels with status information, although these were of limited functionality as they could only show pre-prepared graphs. This consisted of slides.

The project is described in some detail in the second edition of Stafford Beer's books Brain of the Firm and Platform for Change. The latter book includes proposals for social innovations such as having representatives of diverse 'stakeholder' groups into the control centre.

A related development was known as the Project Cyberfolk, which allowed citizens to send information about their moods to the Project organizers.

Aesthetics
The Ops room used Tulip chairs similar to those used in the American science fiction TV show Star Trek, although according to the designers, the style was not influenced by science fiction movies.

Legacy
Computer scientist Paul Cockshott and economist Allin Cottrell referenced Project Cybersyn in their 1993 book Towards a New Socialism, citing it as an inspiration for their own proposed model of computer-managed socialist planned economy. The Guardian in 2003 called the project "a sort of socialist internet, decades ahead of its time".

Authors Leigh Phillips and Michal Rozworski also dedicated a chapter on the project in their 2019 book, The People's Republic of Walmart. The authors presented a case to defend the feasibility of a planned economy aided by contemporary processing power used by large organizations such as Amazon, Walmart and the Pentagon. The authors, however, question whether much can be built on Project Cybersyn in particular, specifically, "whether a system used in emergency, near–civil war conditions in a single country—covering a limited number of enterprises and, admittedly, only partially ameliorating a dire situation—can be applied in times of peace and at a global scale" especially as the project was never completed due to the military coup in 1973, which was followed by economic reforms by the Chicago Boys.

Chilean science fiction author Jorge Baradit published a Spanish-language science fiction novel Synco in 2008. It is an alternate history novel set in a 1979 after a military coup was stopped and "the socialist government consolidates and creates 'the first cybernetic state, a universal example, the true third way, a miracle'." Baradit's novel imagines the realized project as an oppressive dictatorship disguised as a bright utopia. In defence of the project, former operations manager of Cybersyn Raul Espejo wrote: "the safeguard against any technocratic tendency was precisely in the very implementation of CyberSyn, which required a social structure based on autonomy and coordination to make its tools viable. [...] Of course politically it was always possible to use information technologies for coercive purposes however that would have been a different project, certainly not SYNCO".

In a 2014 essay for The New Yorker, technology journalist Evgeny Morozov argued that Cybersyn helped pave the way for big data and anticipated how Big Tech would operate, citing Uber's use of data and algorithms to monitor supply and demand for their services in real time as an example.

In October 2016, 99% Invisible produced a podcast about the project. The Radio Ambulante podcast covered some history of Allende and the Cybersyn project in their 2019 episode "The Room That Was A Brain".

See also

Alexander Kharkevich, the director of the Institute for Information Transmission Problems in Moscow (later Kharkevich Institute)
Comparison of system dynamics software
Critique of political economy
Cyberocracy
Economic calculation debate
Enterprise resource planning
Fernando Flores
History of Chile
History of computer hardware in Eastern Bloc countries
Material balance planning
OGAS
System dynamics
Viable system model

References

External links
 Eden Medina, Cybernetic Revolutionaries: Technology and Politics in Allende's Chile, (Cambridge, Massachusetts: MIT Press, 2011).
 Eden Medina, "Designing Freedom, Regulating a Nation: Socialist Cybernetics in Allende's Chile." Journal of Latin American Studies 38 (2006):571-606. (pdf)
 Lessons of Stafford Beer
 The CeberSyn heritage in the XXI Century
 The CyberSyn multimedia "reconstruction" 
 Before ’73 Coup, Chile Tried to Find the Right Software for Socialism, by Alexei Barrionuevo. The New York Times. March 28, 2008
 The forgotten story of Chile's 'socialist internet'
 Futurism, fictional and science fictional - rambling and inspiring on BoingBoing
 Project Cybersyn | varnelis.net
 Rhizome.org: Project Cybersyn
 Stafford Beer, and Salvador Allende's Internet, and the Dystopian Novel
 Free As In Beer: Cybernetic Science Fictions
 Planning Machine at The New Yorker
 Allende’s socialist internet at Red Pepper
 Network Effects: Raul Espejo on Cybernetic Socialism in Salvador Allende’s Chile, Kristen Alfaro interviews Raúl Espejo for Logic. January 1, 2019.

Cybernetics
Economy of Chile
1970s in Chile
Presidency of Salvador Allende
Socialism in Chile
Economic planning
Experimental computer networks
History of computing in South America
Networks
Socialism
1970s economic history
Information management
Chilean inventions
Government by algorithm